The Brazilian Socialist Party (PSB) is a political party in Brazil. It was founded in 1947, before being abolished by the military regime in 1965 and re-organised in 1989 after the re-democratisation of Brazil. It elected six Governors in 2010, becoming the second largest party in number of state governments, behind only PSDB. In addition to that, it won 34 seats in the Chamber of Deputies and three seats in the Senate, besides having been a member of the For Brazil to Keep on Changing coalition, which elected Dilma Rousseff as President of Brazil.

In 2014, the party went into opposition, advocating greater economic stability, low inflation, high economic growth, sustainable development, and social welfare programs.

History

First PSB (1947–1965)
The name Brazilian Socialist Party or variants had been used by several small socialist parties of brief existence prior to the foundation of PSB on 1947.

PSB has its origins at the end of Getúlio Vargas' Estado Novo regime, when the Democratic Left (Esquerda Democrática – ED) emerged as a faction of the National Democratic Union (União Democrática Nacional – UDN) in 1945. Its goals were to combine the social changes of the period with broad civil and political liberties. ED's ideology was based on a broad left-wing concept: it advocated that socialism had to be built gradually and legally, through the defence of democracy and a national identity. In this sense, it differed greatly from other opposition parties, such as UDN, which advocated free market policies, and the Communist Party (PCB), which advocated the authoritarian socialism of the Soviet Union.

As UDN became increasingly a right-leaning party, binding itself with the Brazilian Army and the aspirations of urban middle classes, ED's Socialist proposals were extremely at odds with the party, which led to a split and the subsequent foundation of PSB. On 6 August 1947, the Brazilian Socialist Party was founded, maintaining the same program and proposals it had as a faction of the UDN. In its 1947 manifesto, the PSB sought to represent an alternative to the main left-wing parties of that period: Vargas' Brazilian Labour Party (PTB) and the Brazilian Communist Party (PCB). PSB opposed the centralism and authoritarianism of Vargas, as well as the rigid labour union structure supported by PTB. They opposed PCB's cult of personality and radical Marxism, which placed the PSB in the centre-left to left-wing spectrum, between radical Marxism and social democracy.

PSB proposed to be a party of "everyone who relies on their own work". It advocated immediate reforms, such as the nationalisation of economically strategic areas, the expansion of workers' rights, the ensuring of public health and education, and the development of democracy through means of popular participation. Its structure brought a new experience which characterised PSB's democratic profile: the Base Centres (núcleos de base). Through them, Socialist militants could get involved in the party project, discuss national issues and form the orientation and the target of partisan action.

In the 1950 election, PSB's candidate, João Mangabeira won only 0.12% of the vote and the PSB elected only one deputy from Sergipe. At the same time, the PSB approached the PCB, banned in 1947 and operating underground. A number of communists ran for office under the PSB's endorsement.

In the 1955 election, the PSB endorsed the UDN candidate, Juarez Távora. In São Paulo, the PSB supported the electoral endeavors of Jânio Quadros: first in the São Paulo mayoral election in 1953 and Quadros' successful bid for Governor in 1954. However, the PSB's support for Quadros, a rather middle-class reformer, split the party, a split which ended with the expulsion of Quadros supporters from the party. In the 1960 election, won by Quadros, the PSB supported the candidacy of Henrique Teixeira Lott.

The PSB had limited legislative representation between 1947 and 1964, but in 1962 it elected one Senator, Aurélio Viana defeated the UDN's candidate, Juracy Magalhães in Guanabara State.

The party supported left-wing President João Goulart, who was overthrown by the military in 1964, which later abolished all parties, including the PSB, in 1965. Most Socialists joined the Brazilian Democratic Movement (MDB), the only opposition party recognised by the military regime. Following the fall of the military in 1985, a number of former PSB members joined the Democratic Labour Party or the Workers' Party (PT).

Second PSB (1989–present)
Following the return to a democracy in the country, a Brazilian Socialist Party was re-organised on the 1947 manifesto. At first, it achieved limited electoral success, though it elected some legislators and mayors. In the 1989 presidential election, it supported the PT candidate, Luiz Inácio Lula da Silva.

In 1990, Pernambuco Governor Miguel Arraes joined the party, giving the PSB a certain electoral boost in subsequent elections. In the 1994 election, the party again endorsed Lula. In the same election, Arraes was re-elected Governor with 54% by the first round, and the PSB elected another governor, João Capiberibe, in Amapá, as well as a Senator in Pará. The party continued to grow with the adhesion of several officeholders in 1995 and 1996, but it did not endorse the left-wing candidacy of Ciro Gomes in the 1998 election, preferring to endorse Lula. The same year, Arraes was defeated in Pernambuco but the party gained the governorship of Alagoas.

In 2000, the Governor of Rio de Janeiro, Anthony Garotinho joined the PSB following a feud with Leonel Brizola, the leader of the Democratic Labour Party. The adhesion of Garotinho caused several members of the PSB to leave the party to join Lula's PT. The PSB supported Garotinho's candidacy in the 2002 election, winning 17.9% in the first round.

However, Garotinho's membership proved a source of controversy and division, notably with President Lula's government. The split was resolved when Garotinho left the party in 2003. The party unofficially supported Lula's re-election in 2006 and won 27 deputies in the 2006 election. After that election, the PSB had three Governors: Cid Gomes (Ceará), Eduardo Campos (Pernambuco) and Wilma de Faria (Rio Grande do Norte).

Ciro Gomes joined the PSB in 2003, and was expected to be the PSB's candidate in the 2010 election; however, the PSB decided not to run a presidential candidate.

The PSB did well overall in the 2010 elections; it picked up 7 seats in the Chamber of Deputies for a total of 34 seats, and regained representation in the Senate, winning 3 Senate seats. While it lost the governorship of Rio Grande do Norte, it easily retained the governorships of Ceará and Pernambuco and also overwhelmingly won the governorship of Espírito Santo. Following runoffs, it also won the governorships of Amapá, Paraíba, and Piauí, for a total of 6 state governorships.

Despite its socialist name and identity, the PSB was criticised by many on the Brazilian political scene, especially on the left, for its efforts to attract right-wing Brazilian politicians like senator Heraclito Fortes, and to support the candidacy of Eduardo Campos and, later, Marina Silva. These positions led many traditional socialists and social-democrats in Brazil to leave the party for more left-wing outfits such as the PSOL and PDT.

In 2014 general elections, the PSB did not support Rousseff and was part of the United for Brazil coalition, which supported Marina Silva as its presidential candidate. The party did well in the legislative elections, electing 34 deputies and 7 senators.

The party later voted in favour of the impeachment of Dilma Rousseff and formed a coalition government with Brazil's new president, Michel Temer.

In May 2017, the PSB withdrew its support from Temer and went into opposition.

In the 2018 general election PSB did not support any candidate (although some members of the party supported Ciro Gomes of the Democratic Labour Party) in the first round; it later endorsed Fernando Haddad of the Workers' Party in the second round. The party saw a decrease in support in the parliamentary election, winning 32 deputies and 2 senators. PSB later joined the opposition to Jair Bolsonaro.

On 30 August 2019 the Brazilian Socialist Party withdrew from the Foro de Sao Paulo, denouncing its support of Nicolas Maduro's presidency.

International relations 
Despite being a socialist party, the PSB has never been a member of the Socialist International (position held by the Democratic Labour Party). However, in 2013, it joined the newly formed Progressive Alliance.

In 1991 the party joined the Foro de Sao Paulo, an association of South American leftist parties which also included the majority of Brazilian left-wing formations (PCB, PCdoB, PT, PDT and, until 2004, PPS). However, in 2019 PSB withdrew from the Foro, denouncing its support for the regime of Nicolas Maduro in Venezuela.

Election results

Presidential elections

Chamber of Deputies and Senate elections

References

External links
Official web site

1947 establishments in Brazil
Political parties established in 1947
Progressive Alliance
Socialist parties in Brazil
Social democratic parties in Brazil